Tudorina is a genus of land snails with an operculum, terrestrial gastropod mollusks in the family Pomatiidae.

Species 
Species within the genus Tudorina include:
 Tudorina rangelina (Poey, 1851)

References 

Pomatiidae